Therése Sjömander Magnusson (born 9 April 1970), is a Swedish water researcher and head of the Nordic Africa Institute.

Biography 
Therése Sjömander Magnusson has a PhD in water resources management from Linköping University in Sweden and many years' experience of development assistance to developing countries. On 18 July 2019, the Swedish government appointed her as new Director of the Nordic Africa Institute, a position which she has taken up on 1 October 2019. She has previously worked at Stockholm International Water Institute.

References

1970 births
Living people
Swedish women writers
Swedish women academics
Linköping University alumni